This is a list of villages in Finnmark, a county in Norway. For other counties see the lists of villages in Norway.  The list does not include cities located in Finnmark.

Most villages in this county have Norwegian language names, but many areas also have Sami language and Kven language names.  This is especially common in the bilingual municipalities of Tana, Nesseby, Porsanger, Kautokeino, and Karasjok.  When there are multiple official names for a village, they are included in this list.

References

External links 

Finnmark